is a series of free-roaming scrolling shooter type video games developed by the Japanese software company Technosoft and published by Sega. The franchise is recognized for its distinctive gameplay, graphics, and synthesizer-based chiptune music soundtracks.

There are six games in the series in total. The first appeared on the personal computers. The majority of installments in the series appeared on the Mega Drive console. The most recent entry was released on PlayStation 2.

History
The series' first game, Thunder Force, appeared in 1983 on a variety of Japanese computers, such as the X1, PC-8801 mkII, and FM-7. Since Thunder Force II, the majority of installments in the series appeared on the Mega Drive console, where the series gained much of its popularity. The most recent entry was released on PlayStation 2.

The original Thunder Force video game was created by Kotori Yoshimura in 1983. She later left Technosoft and founded Arsys Software in 1985, where herself and Osamu Nagano worked on notable titles such as Star Cruiser. In 1984, Technosoft released a level editor, or game creation system, titled Thunder Force Construction, created by Yoshimura for the FM-7 computer.

In September 2016, Sega announced at the Tokyo Game Show that they own the rights to the Thunder Force franchise and all other Technosoft intellectual properties.

Games
Thunder Force (X1) (1983)
Thunder Force II (X68000) (1988)
Thunder Force II MD (Mega Drive/Genesis) (1989) (port of Thunder Force II)
Thunder Force III (Mega Drive/Genesis) (1990)
Thunder Force AC (Arcade) (1990) (port of Thunder Force III retooled into an arcade game)
Thunder Spirits (Super NES) (1991) (port of Thunder Force AC)
Thunder Force IV (Mega Drive/Genesis) (1992) (a.k.a. Lightening Force: Quest for the Darkstar)
Thunder Force Gold Pack 1 (Sega Saturn) (1996), contains Thunder Force II and Thunder Force III).
Thunder Force Gold Pack 2 (Sega Saturn) (1996), contains Thunder Force IV and Thunder Force AC.
 Thunder Force V (Sega Saturn) (1997)
Thunder Force V: Perfect System (PlayStation) (1998) (port of Thunder Force V)
 Thunder Force VI (PlayStation 2) (2008)

References

 
horizontally scrolling shooters
Sega Games franchises
video game franchises introduced in 1983